The Austrian Physical Society is the national physical society of Austria.

History
Until 1938, Austrian physicists were part of the German Physical Society. On 13 December 1950, it was decided to found a separate society for Austria and Fritz Kohlrausch was elected as first president in 1951.

Prizes
Every year it awards a prize to a promising young physicist. Alternating every year, this is the Ludwig Boltzmann Prize for theoretical physics
and the Fritz Kohlrausch Prize for experimental physics.

References

External links
Official website

Physics societies
Scientific organisations based in Austria
Scientific organizations established in 1950
1950 establishments in Austria